Jelena Stanković (born 28 March 1993) is a former Serbian women's basketball player.

References

External links
 Profile at eurobasket.com

1993 births
Living people
Basketball players from Belgrade
Serbian women's basketball players
ŽKK Crvena zvezda players
ŽKK Partizan players
ŽKK Voždovac players
Guards (basketball)